Spring Hammock Preserve is a  natural area in Seminole County, Florida. Its mucky areas protect examples of hydric hammock and floodplain forest. Sandy terrain supports upland hardwood and pine flatwood ecosystems. Many animal and plant species in the preserve are either rare or near their range limit.

References

Parks in Seminole County, Florida
Urban public parks